Carmen Cano Ruiz (born 31 December 1992) is a Spanish field hockey player for the Spanish national team.

She participated at the 2018 Women's Hockey World Cup.

References

External links

1992 births
Living people
Spanish female field hockey players
Club de Campo Villa de Madrid players
Field hockey players at the 2020 Summer Olympics